Newcombe is a British surname of Brythonic origin, "-combe" or "-coombe" being cognate with the Welsh "cwm" meaning valley.

People
 Anton Newcombe (born 1967), American musician
 Bertha Newcombe (1857–1947), English artist and suffrage activist
 Bobby Newcombe (born 1979), American football player
 Charles F. Newcombe (1851–1924), British botanist
 Don Newcombe (1926–2019), American baseball player
 Edmund Leslie Newcombe (1859–1931), Canadian lawyer and Puisne Justice of the Supreme Court of Canada
 Frederick Charles Newcombe (1858–1927), American botanist
 Hanna Newcombe (1922–2011), Canadian co-founder of Peace Research Abstracts and Peace Research Reviews 
 John Newcombe (born 1944), Australian tennis player
 Kim Newcombe (1944–1973), Grand Prix motorcycle road racer from New Zealand 
 Nora Newcombe (born 1951), Canadian-American psychologist
 S.F. Newcombe (1878–1956), British army officer and surveyor

Other
 Rural Municipality of Newcombe No. 260, Saskatchewan, Canada
 Operation Newcombe, the British contribution in 2013 to French-led military involvement in Mali

See also
 Newcomb (surname)
 Newcome, name